Still Kicking: The Fabulous Palm Springs Follies is a 1997 American short documentary film directed by Mel Damski. It was nominated at the 70th Academy Awards for Best Documentary Short Subject.  It features The Fabulous Palm Springs Follies, which was formerly staged at the Palm Springs, California Plaza Theatre.

Riff Markowitz is presented as the host and creator of the Follies. Some of the featured performers include Dorothy Kloss, Henry LeTang and Tempest Storm.

References

Notes
 Still Kicking: The Fabulous Palm Springs Follies (1997). Santa Monica, CA: Little Apple Productions. VHS. (39 minutes).

External links
 
 

1997 documentary films
1997 independent films
1997 films
1997 short films
American short documentary films
Documentary films about dance
Films scored by Dennis McCarthy
Films directed by Mel Damski
Films set in Palm Springs, California
Films shot in California
La Plaza, Palm Springs
Palm Springs, California
1990s English-language films
1990s American films
1990s short documentary films